Louis Prette Jr. (born 31 July 1998 in Monte Carlo) is a Monégasque-Italian racing driver. He currently competes in the International GT Open championship.

Biography
Given his father's unprecedented success in Ferrari Challenge Asia-Pacific, Prette's career began in Asia with the Asian Formula Renault Series in 2016. Having taken third in the championship the following year, he graduated to Asian Formula 3 where he finished ninth in the standings before moving into GT racing – returning to Europe and following in his father's footsteps by contesting the European Ferrari Challenge, winning the championship by 3 points. He progressed to GT3 competition the following year, entering the International GT Open series with Vincent Abril.

Outside of racing he is the Global Head of Retail for his mother Ariane's fashion company APM Monaco, based in Hong Kong.

Racing record

Career summary

Complete F3 Asian Championship results
(key) (Races in bold indicate pole position) (Races in italics indicate fastest lap)

Complete 24 Hours of Le Mans results

References

External links
 Profile at Driver Database

Italian racing drivers
Monegasque racing drivers
1998 births
Living people
Monegasque people of Italian descent
People from Monte Carlo
F3 Asian Championship drivers
24 Hours of Le Mans drivers
Asian Formula Renault Challenge drivers
Asian Le Mans Series drivers
International GT Open drivers
KCMG drivers
AF Corse drivers
Chinese F4 Championship drivers
Saintéloc Racing drivers
BlackArts Racing drivers
Ferrari Challenge drivers